Robert Paul Wine, Jr. (born July 13, 1962) is an American former professional baseball player. A catcher, Wine played parts of two seasons in Major League Baseball for the Houston Astros in 1986 and 1987. He last played professional baseball in 1990. He was the head baseball coach of the Penn State Nittany Lions from 2005–2013. In 2014, Wine managed the Eugene Emeralds, a minor league team in the San Diego Padres organization.

Early years
Wine graduated from Methacton High School in Norristown, PA in 1980 where he was a stand-out catcher.

Playing career
Wine was an All-American catcher for the Oklahoma State Cowboys, where he played from 1981–1983. In 1982, he played collegiate summer baseball with the Wareham Gatemen of the Cape Cod Baseball League and was named a league all-star. He was drafted in the first round (8th overall) of the 1983 Major League Baseball draft by the Astros.

After three seasons of minor league baseball, Wine made his major league debut on September 2, 1986 as a September call-up. He played nine games, getting 3 hits in 12 at bats.

In 1987, Wine was called up again in July after both Mark Bailey and Ronn Reynolds had been tried as the backup catcher to Alan Ashby. Wine played in 13 games in July and August, but batted just .103. He appeared in one final major league game on October 3. He was traded from the Astros to the Texas Rangers for Mike Loynd during spring training on March 25, 1988. He played in five different organizations from 1988 to 1990 without returning to the majors.

Coaching career
After his playing career ended following the 1990 season, Wine served as an assistant coach in professional baseball from 1991–1996. Prior to the 1997 season, he accepted an assistant coaching position at his alma mater Oklahoma State. Prior to the 2005 season, he was hired as the head baseball coach at Penn State. Following the 2013 season, he resigned the position. His career record was 228-262.

Head coaching record
Below is a table of Wine's yearly records as an NCAA head baseball coach.

Personal
Wine is the son of Philadelphia Phillies and Montreal Expos infielder Bobby Wine.

See also
 List of current NCAA Division I baseball coaches
 List of second-generation Major League Baseball players

References

External links

Living people

1962 births
All-American college baseball players
Auburn Astros players
Baseball players from Pennsylvania
Canton-Akron Indians players
Columbus Astros players
Columbus Clippers players
Daytona Beach Astros players
Eugene Emeralds managers
Greenville Braves players
Houston Astros players
Indianapolis Indians players
Major League Baseball catchers
Oklahoma City 89ers players
Oklahoma State Cowboys baseball coaches
Oklahoma State Cowboys baseball players
Penn State Nittany Lions baseball coaches
Richmond Braves players
Tucson Toros players
Wareham Gatemen players